Lick High School may refer to:

James Lick High School
Lick-Wilmerding High School